Ramy Abdu (Arabic: رامي عبده) (or Ramy Abdo ) is a Palestinian financial expert, assistant professor of Law and Finance, and human rights advocate who was born in the Gaza Strip. He is the founder and chairman of the Euro-Mediterranean Human Rights Monitor, established in 2011.  As the chairman of the Euro-Mediterranean Human Rights Monitor, Abdu delivered several oral statements and took part in different events at the United Nations Human Rights Council, addressing human rights violations in the Middle East and North Africa Region.

Ramy Abdu is a policy analyst with the Al-Shabaka, a Palestinian policy network. He sponsored the establishment of We Are Not Numbers in early 2015. Conceived by American journalist Pam Bailey under the umbrella of the Euro-Mediterranean Human Rights Monitor, the project was launched for young adults in the Gaza Strip and designed both to help them share their narratives (and those of their people) in their own words with the Western (English-speaking) world and bust stereotypes about Palestinians.

Early life and education 
Ramy Abdu holds a PhD and MRes in Law and Finance from the Manchester Metropolitan University, and an MBA in Finance from the University of Jordan. Before he served as the chairman of the Euro-Mediterranean Human Rights Monitor,  Abdu worked as a project and investment coordinator for the World Bank and other internationally funded projects aiming at tackling the economic and humanitarian crisis in the Palestinian territories.

Published Works 
Ramy Abdu authored and co-authored several publications, including The Influence of Minority Shareholder Protection on Equity Market Development, a book published by Google Books, Escaping the Escape: Toward Solutions for the Humanitarian Migration Crisis, a book published by Bertelsmann Stiftung (ed.) in 2017, in which he analysed Palestinians’ motives to take deadly risks to attempt to leave the Gaza Strip, The Effect of the 50-day Conflict in Gaza on Children: A Descriptive Study, published by the Lancet., and As MENA States Grow Increasingly Repressive, Businesses Should Lead Reform, published on the Journal of Political Risk, in which he analysed businesses' responsibility of challenging repressive policies and human rights violations in the MENA region. Abdu's published works also appear on University of Oxford, London School of Economics, OpenDeomcracy,Middle East Eye and Insight Turkey.

References 

Living people
Year of birth missing (living people)
Palestinian financial analysts
Non-profit executives
Alumni of Manchester Metropolitan University
University of Jordan alumni
World Bank people
Founders
Chairpersons of non-governmental organizations